Stenochrus is a genus of hubbardiid short-tailed whipscorpions, first described by Ralph Vary Chamberlin in 1922.

Species 
, the World Schizomida Catalog accepts the following ten species:

 Stenochrus alcalai Monjaraz-Ruedas & Francke, 2018 – Mexico
 Stenochrus chimalapas Monjaraz-Ruedas & Francke, 2018 – Mexico
 Stenochrus gruta Monjaraz-Ruedas & Francke, 2018 – Mexico
 Stenochrus guatemalensis (Chamberlin, 1922) – Guatemala
 Stenochrus leon Armas, 1995 – Nicaragua
 Stenochrus meambar Armas & Víquez, 2010 – Honduras
 Stenochrus moisii (Rowland, 1973) – Mexico
 Stenochrus pecki (Rowland, 1973) – Mexico
 Stenochrus portoricensis Chamberlin, 1922 – North America, South America, Europe
 Stenochrus tepezcuintle Armas & Cruz López, 2009 – Mexico

References 

Schizomida genera